Michael Little (born 14 March 1993) is a New Zealand rugby union player who currently plays either as a midfield back or fullback for the Sunwolves in Super Rugby.   He was named as a member of the  wider training group ahead of the 2016 Super Rugby season. As the only try scorer for his team, Little was an important part of  winning the 2016 Mitre 10 Cup championship against . Little was also nominated for the 2016 Mitre 10 Cup player of the year award.

Little was part of Fiji Under 20s and travelled to the 2012 IRB Junior World Championship .

References

1993 births
Living people
New Zealand rugby union players
Rugby union centres
Rugby union fullbacks
North Harbour rugby union players
New Zealand people of Fijian descent
People educated at Westlake Boys High School
Sunwolves players
Mitsubishi Sagamihara DynaBoars players
Kobelco Kobe Steelers players